South Valley Park is Jefferson County Open Space located in Jefferson County west of Ken Caryl, Colorado. The  Front Range park established in 1999  has  of hiking trails. Facilities include a parking lot, restrooms, picnic sites.

The Fountain and Lyons Formations pierce the meadows and scrubland of the park.
Rocky mountain juniper and Gambel oak are found around the rock spires.   Commonly seen wildlife includes mule deer, elk.  Common birds include steller's jay.

The park has been occupied by humans as early as 10,000 years ago.  The earliest evidence is a 10,000-year-old Folsom spear point found in the park.  Numerous fire pits and stone tools have also been found in the area.  A human skull found at a burial site has been carbon dated to approximately 1,900 years ago.

Gallery

References

https://www.jeffco.us/1431/South-Valley-Park

External links 

Protected areas of Jefferson County, Colorado
Geography of Jefferson County, Colorado
Hiking trails in Colorado
Protected areas established in 1999
Parks in Colorado
1999 establishments in Colorado